Sevilla FC Puerto Rico was a Puerto Rican professional association football team based in Juncos, Puerto Rico. Founded in 2006, the team used to play in the Puerto Rico Soccer League. The club was founded in 2006 as a farm team for the Puerto Rico Islanders of the North American Soccer League in Bayamón, but in 2008 partnered with the Spanish La Liga club Sevilla FC and moved a year later to Juncos. Sevilla won both the regular season and play-offs in the inaugural season of the Puerto Rico Soccer League in 2008, and also won the regular season in 2011 before losing the play-off final on penalties to Leones.

The team used to play its home games at Josué Elevadito González Stadium, and the team's colors are white, black, blue and gold. Their current head coach is Francis Muñoz. The team also has a secondary team called Atletico Sevilla that plays in Liga Nacional de Futbol de Puerto Rico, the other 1st division of football in Puerto Rico.

History
The club was formed in 2006 as Puerto Rico Islanders B, a farm team for the United Soccer League's Puerto Rico Islanders, and played in the now defunct "Liga Premier" from 2006 to 2007. The team were based in Bayamón, outside San Juan, with their parent club. In 2008 the club found a new affiliate in the shape of Sevilla FC of La Liga, one of the leading clubs of Spain. and changed their name to Sevilla Bayamón FC. The club became one of the eight founders of the Puerto Rico Soccer League, the first nationwide league in Puerto Rico.  Before the 2009 season the club folded due to ownership problems, however the city of Juncos bought them in time for the 2009 season thus allowing Sevilla FC Puerto Rico defend its title.

Sevilla FC debuted on 3 July 2008, in a 1–0 victory over Huracán,  and followed the victory by beating River Plate by the same score. On 20 July 2008, Sevilla FC defeated Academia Quintana to go into first place in the league. The team solidified their position in the fourth game, where they defeated San Juan 1–0, and then defeated Tornados de Humacao 11–1. The run of five victories from the start of the season ended on 10 August 2008, when they drew against Fluminense. This marked the end of the league's first half, the teams would then compete against each other a second time. In the first two games of this stage, Sevilla FC defeated Gigantes de Carolina and Caguas Huracán. To close the regular season, the team won 3, lost 2 and drew 1 game. On 2 October 2008, Sevilla defeated the Carolina Giants 6–0 to clinch the first place of this stage. On Saturday 18 October 2008 Sevilla  won the first Puerto Rico Soccer League Championship 2–1 against River Plate.

In the 2009 season, the team moved to Juncos and were renamed Sevilla-FC Juncos. Sevilla-FC Juncos won their first game of the 2009 season against Bayamón (1–0).

Sevilla won their next game 5–1 against Caguas Huracan.  The club ended their season in 3rd place and losing in the semifinals of the 2009 Puerto Rico Soccer League Playoffs to the eventual winners Bayamon FC. In 2011 Sevilla won the regular league championship but lost in a penalty shootout to Leones in the play-off final.

Colors and badge
Up until 2007, they wore uniforms resembling that of their parent club, the Puerto Rico Islanders, using the same colors of orange, dark blue and white. In 2008, when they partnered with Sevilla FC of Spain they adopted this team's uniforms and colors of white, purple, red and black. The current home kit is a replica of one of Sevilla FC's old uniforms: it is all white with black and red paint strokes that run horizontally just below the arm from right to left. The away uniforms also use this strokes but instead of black it uses white.

Stadium
 Juan Ramon Loubriel Stadium; Bayamon, Puerto Rico (2006–2007)
 Alfredo "Papo" Alejandro Stadium; Juncos, Puerto Rico (2008–2010)
 Josué Elevadito González Stadium; Juncos, Puerto Rico (2011–present)

When Sevilla FC Juncos was called Sevilla Bayamon FC, it played its matches at the Juan Ramon Loubriel Stadium in Bayamon, but after it moved from Bayamon to Juncos due to financial problems, Sevilla-FC Juncos new stadium will be located in the town of Juncos.  The new stadium is going to be named Sevilla FC Stadium. They currently play at the Josué Elevadito González Stadium in Juncos.

Achievements
Puerto Rico Soccer League:
Play-off Champion: 2008,
League Champion: 2008, 2011

Atlético Sevilla PR
Liga Premier de Fútbol de Puerto Rico:
Runners-up (1): 2006

Record

Year-by-year

References

External links
 Sevilla FC-Juncos official site
 Sevilla FCPR News

 
Association football clubs established in 2006
Association football clubs disestablished in 2013
Puerto Rico
Football clubs in Puerto Rico
Puerto Rico Soccer League teams
Former USL Championship teams
Liga Nacional de Fútbol de Puerto Rico teams
2006 establishments in Puerto Rico